Diego Pablo Simeone González (born 28 April 1970), nicknamed "El Cholo", is an Argentine professional football manager and former player who played as a midfielder; he has been the manager of Atlético Madrid since December 2011.

In his club career that started in 1987, Simeone played in Argentina, Italy, and Spain for Vélez Sarsfield, Pisa, Sevilla, Atlético Madrid, Inter Milan, Lazio, and Racing Club. He won a domestic double with Atlético Madrid in 1996, and the UEFA Cup with Inter in 1998, also winning another domestic double with Lazio in 2000, as well as the 1999 UEFA Super Cup and the 2000 Supercoppa Italiana. Simeone was capped over 100 times for the Argentina national team and represented the country at the 1994, 1998, and 2002 FIFA World Cups, and in four editions of the Copa América, winning the tournament in 1991 and 1993. He also won the King Fahd Cup in 1992, the 1993 Artemio Franchi Cup, and a silver medal at the 1996 Summer Olympic games.

As a manager, Simeone has coached Argentine sides Racing Club, Estudiantes de La Plata, River Plate, and San Lorenzo and Italian club Catania before joining Spanish club Atlético Madrid in 2011. He won the Argentine Primera División both with Estudiantes and River Plate and has had his biggest managerial success with Atlético Madrid, winning La Liga twice, the Copa del Rey, two UEFA Europa Leagues, two UEFA Super Cups, as well as being runner-up of the UEFA Champions League twice. Simeone is the longest-serving manager in La Liga, having stayed over a decade at Atlético.

Club career

When Simeone was 14, his youth coach Victorio Spinetto nicknamed him "Cholo", as his energetic play reminded him of former Boca Juniors player and Argentine international Carmelo Simeone (no relation) who possessed the nickname.

After starting his career with Vélez Sarsfield, Simeone moved to Italian Serie A club Pisa in 1990. The club was relegated in his first season and, after it failed to gain promotion the following year, Simeone was sold to Sevilla in the Spanish La Liga. Simeone played two seasons in Seville, after which he was signed by Atlético Madrid. At Atlético, he was part of the team which won the double of the Liga title and Copa del Rey during the 1995–96 season.

In 1997, Simeone returned to Serie A with Inter Milan, and played two full seasons, winning the 1997–98 UEFA Cup in a side spearheaded by Ronaldo up front. In 1999, Simeone joined fellow Argentines Néstor Sensini, Matías Almeyda and Juan Sebastián Verón at Sven-Göran Eriksson's Lazio. The side had gone close to the Scudetto in the season before Simeone's arrival and he helped deliver the championship after a season, where Juventus led the standings by two points going into the last day. A Juve loss at rainy Perugia coupled with Lazio's comfortable home win over Reggina at the Stadio Olimpico ensured Simeone's first Serie A title. After winning the double in Spain, he would then add the Italian double as Lazio edged out Inter to claim the 1999–2000 Coppa Italia.

He went on to play three more seasons in Rome, which included more last day drama as Simeone's goal against former club Inter on the last day of the 2001–02 campaign effectively ruined his old employers' title dream.

After cancelling his contract with Lazio, Simeone returned to Atlético Madrid in 2003, spending his next two seasons there. In total, he played in 165 matches for Atlético, scoring 31 goals. In December 2004, it was confirmed that he would leave Europe and return to Argentina to finish his playing career with Racing Club.

International career

In 1992, Simeone represented the Argentina under-23 team at the 1992 CONMEBOL Pre-Olympic Tournament in Paraguay, which saw Argentina fail to qualify for the 1992 Summer Olympics.

For the Argentina senior team, Simeone amassed 106 caps, the first coming in 1988.

Simeone won the 1991 and 1993 editions of the Copa América with Argentina. He played in the 1994, 1998, and 2002 FIFA World Cups. He was part of the Argentina under-23 squad that won the silver medal at the 1996 Summer Olympics in Atlanta, as one of the three overage players allowed per squad. As a midfielder, Simeone scored 11 goals for his country, including one in the final of the 1992 King Fahd Cup.

During the 1998 World Cup, England's David Beckham was sent off for kicking Simeone in retaliation for a foul (see also Argentina–England football rivalry). Simeone later said he simulated the injury from the kick in order to get Beckham sent off. Sports Illustrated was critical of the Argentinian's theatrics in that incident, stating Simeone first delivered a "heavy-handed challenge" on Beckham and then "fell like a ton of bricks" when Beckham retaliated. In the following match, against the Netherlands, Simeone was injured by a tackle from Arthur Numan during his team's defeat. In the 2002 World Cup, his last, Argentina was eliminated in the group stage, which included a 1–0 loss to England in which Beckham converted a penalty.

Simeone said he was "embarrassed" at having surpassed Diego Maradona as Argentina's most capped player, though Simeone has since been surpassed by Roberto Ayala, Javier Mascherano, Javier Zanetti, and Lionel Messi.

Style of play
Simeone was regarded as a tenacious, versatile, hard-working and complete two-way midfielder who was mobile, good in the air, and capable both of winning balls and starting attacking plays, while also having a penchant for scoring several goals himself. This enabled him to play anywhere in midfield throughout his career, although he was usually deployed in the centre in a box-to-box or defensive midfield role. He was also used in an offensive midfield role on occasion, even if it was not his optimal playing position. A talented yet combative player, he was primarily known for his leadership, tactical versatility, intelligence, strength and stamina, although he was also praised by pundits for his technique, vision and passing range. Simeone once described his style as "holding a knife between his teeth". His main inspirations as a player were Brazilian midfielder Falcão and German midfielder Lothar Matthäus.

Managerial career

Early years
Simeone ended his playing career for Racing Club, playing his last match on 17 February 2006, and then became manager for the same team. After a rough start, the team made an impressive finish in the 2006 Clausura. When a new club president was elected, Simeone left Racing in May 2006 and was replaced by Reinaldo Merlo.

On 18 May, Simeone became head coach of Estudiantes de La Plata and soon led them to their Second league title in 23 years after defeating Boca Juniors 2–1 in a final match played on 13 December 2006. In an October 2006 poll in the sports daily Olé, Simeone was voted as the best manager in the Argentine league. He was also praised as a "born manager" by former Argentine international Roberto Perfumo. Simeone left Estudiantes after the end of the 2007 Apertura, where Estudiantes was not a contender after a poor start, but had a strong finish of nine games without defeat. On 15 December 2007, Simeone was unveiled as the new River Plate coach, succeeding Daniel Passarella. The contract was reported to be for one year, starting on 3 January 2008. After an early elimination in the Copa Libertadores, losing to San Lorenzo in the second round, Simeone and River Plate went on to win the 2008 Clausura championship after beating Olimpo 2–1 in the Monumental. On 7 November 2008, Simeone announced his resignation as coach of River Plate after their elimination in the quarter-finals of the 2008 Copa Sudamericana by Mexican side Chivas and a poor run of form of 11 domestic matches without a win, which left them bottom of the Primera División Argentina with only six matches remaining. On 15 April 2009, Simeone joined San Lorenzo to replace Miguel Ángel Russo following the club's exit in the first round of the 2009 Copa Libertadores. On 3 April 2010, Simeone resigned from San Lorenzo due to poor results and mounting criticism.

Catania and Racing Club
On 19 January 2011, Simeone flew to Sicily to join Serie A side Catania, replacing Marco Giampaolo, who left the club just hours earlier. On 1 June 2011, Simeone left his post after helping Catania stave off relegation. On 21 June 2011, Simeone was named as the new coach of Racing Club for a second spell in charge, replacing Miguel Ángel Russo, who had resigned the week prior.

Atlético Madrid

2011–13: Europa League and Copa del Rey triumphs
On 23 December 2011, Simeone was unveiled as the new Atlético Madrid coach, succeeding Gregorio Manzano, who had been dismissed the day before following defeat to third-tier Albacete in the Copa del Rey. His first game as Atlético manager was a 0–0 away draw against Manuel Pellegrini's Malaga. His first season ended with the team winning the UEFA Europa League by beating Athletic Bilbao 3–0 in the final in Bucharest.

On 31 August 2012, his Atlético side won the UEFA Super Cup after defeating Chelsea 4–1 at the Stade Louis II in Monaco. In the domestic league, the team made an impressive start to the season, finishing the first half in second place, behind only Barcelona and above city rivals Real Madrid. Eventually, Simeone led the team to a third-place finish in the league, which at the time was the best finish in 17 years for Atlético. On 17 May 2013, he won the Copa del Rey after Atlético defeated rivals Real Madrid 2–1 at the Santiago Bernabéu Stadium.

2013–17: La Liga win and Champions League finals

Atlético began the 2013–14 season with a similar squad to their prior season, despite selling star player Radamel Falcao to Monaco for a reported €60 million fee. They also acquired David Villa from Barcelona on a free transfer. While the season began with a defeat to Barça in the 2013 Supercopa de España, the team recorded eight-straight victories in La Liga, the best league start in club history. This included a 1–0 away win at the Santiago Bernabéu against Real Madrid, making Simeone the first Atlético manager since Claudio Ranieri in 1999 to record a league victory there. Atlético finished the first half of the season in first place in La Liga, level on points with Barcelona at 47. In the last round of the season, on 17 May, Atlético needed at least a draw in the Camp Nou against Barcelona to be crowned champions for the first time since 1996, while a loss would give the title to Barcelona. A Diego Godín header from a corner kick in the 48th minute gave Atlético an equaliser and the draw they needed to win their tenth league title and first since 1996, when Simeone himself was an Atlético player.

Simeone became the second Argentine manager after Helenio Herrera to hand Atlético a Spanish championship, and the second manager after Luis Aragonés to win it both as a player and as a coach of the team. Under Simeone, Atlético collected 90 points in La Liga, surpassing its 1996 record of 87, making the 2013–14 season the most successful in club history.

Also in 2013–14, Atlético finished top of their Champions League group and qualified for the quarter-finals with a 5–1 aggregate win over Milan in the round of 16. This was the first time they had reached the Champions League quarter-finals since 1996–97, when Simeone played for the team. In the quarter-finals, Atlético defeated Barcelona 2–1 on aggregate from Simeone's tactic of cutting the swift-passing midfield of Barcelona in two, thus denying them space and isolating Xavi and Andrés Iniesta from forwards Lionel Messi and Neymar. In the semi-finals, Atlético defeated José Mourinho's Chelsea 3–1 at Stamford Bridge following a goalless draw at home to reach the Champions League final for only the second time in club history, the first being in 1974. Atlético was the only undefeated team in the Champions League prior to the final, recording nine wins and three draws, and had the best defence in the competition, conceding only 6 goals in 12 matches.

In the final on 24 May 2014, Atlético faced city rivals Real Madrid at the Estádio da Luz in Lisbon. Despite leading from Diego Godín's header, Atlético conceded a late equaliser in the 93rd minute of the match. The goal hampered Atlético's morale, and the team ended up losing 4–1 after extra time, with Simeone losing the opportunity to be the third Argentine coach to win the Champions League, after Luis Carniglia and Helenio Herrera. After the final goal, Real Madrid's Raphaël Varane kicked the ball towards Simeone, causing Simeone to run onto the pitch in anger. He was sent to the stands, and Varane was booked for the incident. Reflecting, Simeone said, "I also made a mistake with my reaction. He's a young guy with a bright future." Simeone also admitted a mistake in selecting striker Diego Costa to start the match, as he had been recently injured and was forced off after eight minutes.

In the summer of 2014, Chelsea acquired Diego Costa, Filipe Luís and Thibaut Courtois from Atlético, and also David Villa moved to the MLS. In response, Atlético acquired striker Mario Mandžukić from Bayern Munich, goalkeeper Jan Oblak from Benfica and forwards Antoine Griezmann from Real Sociedad and Ángel Correa from San Lorenzo, and recovered young midfielder Saúl who was on loan at Rayo Vallecano. The season started with Atlético defeating city rivals Real Madrid for the Spanish Super Cup in August and repeating the previous year's victory in the Bernabéu for the league in September. In January, the team acquired Fernando Torres on loan from Milan. However, Atlético finished the league in third place and was eliminated in the UEFA Champions League quarter-finals by Real Madrid 1–0, on aggregate.

Before the start of the 2015–16 season, Filipe Luís returned from Chelsea with the team also acquiring Montenegrin defender Stefan Savić and Belgian midfielder Yannick Carrasco. Mario Mandžukić left for Juventus. In 2015–16, Atlético was the team with the best defensive record in Europe's "big five" leagues, only allowing 18 goals scored against them in 38 La Liga games. Atlético was also the team with the most clean sheets in their games. The team was contending the league title until the last fixture against Barcelona and Real Madrid, settling for third with 88 points.

In the UEFA Champions League, Simeone led Atlético to their second Champions League final in three seasons, becoming the first Argentine manager since Héctor Cúper to reach two Champions League finals. Atlético had defeated PSV on penalties during the round of 16, beat defending champions Barcelona 3–2 on aggregate and favourites Bayern Munich 2–2, going through on away goals, setting up a repeat of the 2014 final again facing Real Madrid. The match ended 1–1 after extra time leading to a penalty shootout. Juanfran was the only player to miss his kick, enabling Cristiano Ronaldo to score Real's last spot kick, condemning Atlético to a second Champions League final defeat in three seasons.

In the summer of 2016, Atlético purchased forward Kevin Gameiro from Sevilla, midfielder Nicolás Gaitán from Benfica, and defender Šime Vrsaljko from Sassuolo. They also acquired the rights to Fernando Torres (previously on loan from Milan). The team again finished third in the league and lost in the UEFA Champions League semi-finals, again to Real Madrid.

2017–21: Second Europa League and La Liga victories
On 5 September 2017, Simeone extended his contract with Atlético for two more years, until June 2020. In the 2017–18 season, Atlético would finish in second place in La Liga, behind Barcelona but ahead of city rivals Real Madrid.

In the 2017–18 UEFA Champions League group stage, Atlético did not advance and dropped to the 2017–18 UEFA Europa League. In January 2018, Diego Costa returned to Atlético from Chelsea. On 16 May 2018, the team won the 2018 UEFA Europa League Final against Marseille. Simeone was sent to the stands in the first leg of the semi-finals against Arsenal and was suspended. He was forced to watch the second leg and final from the stands.

In the 2018–19 season, Atlético bought Thomas Lemar from AS Monaco and Rodri from Villarreal, and in January 2019 acquired Álvaro Morata on loan from Chelsea, while longtime team captain Gabi signed for Qatari club Al-Sadd before the start of the season. The team again finished second in the league behind Barcelona and ahead of city rivals Real Madrid. In the Champions League, they advanced to the first knockout round, where they were eliminated by Juventus, winning the first leg 2–0 at the Wanda Metropolitano but losing the return leg 3–0 in Turin.

Simeone guided his side into the last 16 of UEFA Champions League for the sixth time since he came to reign in 2011, while before his arrival Atlético had only done so 7 times in 60 years. On 11 March 2020, Atletico Madrid eliminated the reigning European champions Liverpool with a 3–2 triumph after extra-time at Anfield, winning 4–2 on aggregate, after Saul secured a 1–0 first-leg win in the reverse via a 5th-minute strike.
On 27 June 2020, Simeone won his 195th game in the top-flight of Spanish football as Atleti beat Deportivo Alavés 2–1 on Saturday. With the triumph, the Argentine has overtaken the club legend, Luis Aragonés (194), as the manager with the most La Liga wins in the club’s history.
On 7 July 2020, Simeone overtook John Toshack as the third coach with the most games managed at a single club in the history of the top-flight of Spanish football during Atleti's match against Celta Vigo, his 323rd game in La Liga. Only Miguel Muñoz (Real Madrid, 424) and, the club legend, Luis Aragonés (407) remain ahead of him.

For the 2020–21 season, Atlético parted ways with longtime-serving forward Diego Costa and acquired Luis Suárez after his departure from Barcelona. The team brought back Yannick Carrasco from Dalian Professional and also acquired Geoffrey Kondogbia from Valencia, Lucas Torreira on loan from Arsenal and Moussa Dembelé on loan from Lyon, while Thomas Partey left for Arsenal and Álvaro Morata was loaned to Juventus. On 17 October 2020, Simeone reached his 200th win in the league in a 2–0 away win against Celta Vigo. On 30 December 2020, he reached his 500th match in charge of Atletico Madrid in a 1–0 win over Getafe.
On 10 March 2021, Simeone overtook Luis Aragonés for the most wins ever as manager of the club in a 2–1 home win against Athletic Bilbao, his 309th win overall.

After a 4–0 away defeat to Bayern Munich and many injuries to key players in November 2020, Simeone modified the formation of his squad by introducing a three-man defence for the first time in his tenure coaching Atlético. In this formation, Carrasco played as a wing-back, with left centre-back Mario Hermoso being instructed to also cover the left-back position when Carrasco moved forward, which made the formation tactically-flexible between a three-man and four-man defence. After the formational change, Atlético were solidified defensively and began a streak of victories, including a 1–0 home victory against Barcelona. This streak propelled the team to a 10-point lead over Real Madrid and Barcelona in the 2020–21 La Liga title race by February. However, a series of bad results from February to April meant that Atlético were eliminated from the Champions League by Chelsea and Real Madrid closed the league gap to two points before the final matchday, meaning Atlético needed a victory in the last La Liga round to win the championship. Thanks to a Suárez goal in the 67th minute, Atlético Madrid managed eventually to win their second La Liga title under Simeone, after a 2–1 away win over Real Valladolid on the final match day.

On 8 July 2021, Atleti announced their extension to Simeone's contract until 2024, and in the same announcement it was also made known that the members of his coaching staff had also renewed their contracts.

Style of management

Simeone's preferred formation is the 4–4–2, which he first practised when he was manager of Estudiantes de la Plata in 2006. In this formation, the two wingers move inside and act like attacking midfielders, creating space for the full backs and fluidity in the attack, effectively being a 4–2–2–2 when the team is on the offensive. The two holding midfielders provide the defensive muscle needed to win midfield battles. Utilizing this formation, Simeone's Estudiantes won the 2006 Apertura by beating Boca Juniors 2–1 while being down to ten men from the first half. It is essentially this formation that Simeone also utilizes at Atlético Madrid. Simeone has listed his coaching influences being Marcelo Bielsa, Sven-Göran Eriksson, Alfio Basile, Victorio Spinetto, Luigi Simoni, Carlos Bilardo, and Radomir Antić.

When he was manager at River Plate, a team graced with the attacking talents of Radamel Falcao, Alexis Sánchez, Ariel Ortega, Mauro Rosales, Diego Buonanotte, Augusto Fernández, and Sebastián Abreu, Simeone played an aggressive 3–3–1–3 formation reminiscent of those used by influential manager (and Simeone's mentor) Marcelo Bielsa. Using this formation, River won the 2008 Clausura, but in the next season, with Sánchez having returned to Udinese and several players suffering from injuries, the 3–3–1–3 backfired and River finished bottom of the table, with Simeone being sacked in the process.

A common feature of Simeone's teams is defensive compactness and quick counter-attacks. Their defending consists of two stages: deep defending in their own defensive third in a narrow 4–4–2 consisting of two closely connected defensive lines of four players, and counter-pressing in their opponents' third to win the ball high up the pitch. When the ball is won, the team attack as a unit, deploying their fluid 4–2–2–2 formation, with the forwards often shifting to the flanks to create even more space. In defense, the key idea is to force opponents into wide areas, gain numerical dominance in the ball's zone and steal the ball or force the opponent into a backward pass. Counter-pressing consists of reducing an opposing team's space, disrupting their build-up and reducing the number of "safe" positions for opponents' movement on the pitch, thus eliminating goal threats. Claudio Ranieri's Premier League-winning 2015–16 Leicester City team has been compared to Simeone's Atletico Madrid for upsetting bigger teams by also playing a narrow 4–4–2 and being compact in defense and midfield.

In the short time he managed Italian side Catania in 2011, he switched between a 4–2–3–1 and a 4–3–1–2 in order to bring out the best from playmaker Adrián Ricchiuti while employing many of the counter-attacking features that would later become his trademark at Atlético. Ricchiuti was tasked with linking the midfield and attack and creating chances for whichever of Maxi López, Gonzalo Bergessio and Francesco Lodi were selected up front. Simeone said he did not want to "fossilise [himself] with a rigid tactic," saying managers cannot have a favourite formation "for the simple fact that we have to adapt not to what we like but to what we have to work with". His players stayed compact and narrow when defending, with the widemen – two of Ezequiel Schelotto, Giuseppe Mascara, Raphael Martinho and Alejandro Gómez – expected to drop back and tuck in when out of possession; meanwhile, playmaker Ricchiuti and the central striker – more often than not López – moved back into midfield rather than pressing the centre-backs, with the aim being preventing simple passes into the middle of the pitch.

Simeone is also renowned for his attention to detail and quick adaptability to a game's changing situations. During his time as manager of Atlético Madrid, he has placed emphasis on creating chances from set-pieces, while not allowing the opponent to create chances from set-pieces. Several important goals, including the one that gave Atlético the 2014 La Liga title, have been scored from set-pieces. While his teams aren't known for controlling possession, they are lauded for controlling the pace and space in which a game is played. He is quick in making tactical changes to influence a game's outcome. In the 2015–16 UEFA Champions League semi-final against Bayern in Munich, with his team down 1–0 after 45 minutes, he moved Saúl Ñíguez from the right wing to a holding midfielder position, changing the 4–4–2 to a 4–1–4–1 formation with Yannick Carrasco and Antoine Griezmann on the flanks. While on paper Saúl was seemingly out of his normal position in this role, in effect this change meant that midfielders Gabi and Koke, who were overwhelmed in the first half by Bayern's pressure, would now be shielded by Saúl's presence behind them, and the midfield would regain its much-needed composure. Eventually, the change had the desired outcome, with Atlético equalizing through Griezmann and advancing to the Champions League final.

Simeone has also earned praise for instilling confidence and discipline in his players, which has helped his teams emerge victorious under adverse conditions. For example, in the last game of 2014's La Liga, at the Camp Nou against Barcelona, when Atlético needed a draw to win the championship, both Diego Costa and Arda Turan were taken out of the game due to injury in the first half, and Barcelona opened the scoring. However, Simeone was able to rally his team at half-time and Godin's header in the second half gave them the much needed draw. Simeone said: "At half-time I told them to be relaxed. In the first half we did well. I knew if we scored, it would cost them. That's what happened. There was an amazing collective effort from everyone." During a leg in the 2017–18 UEFA Europa League semi-final against Arsenal at the Emirates Stadium, Atlético were playing without key players Diego Costa, Juanfran, Filipe Luís and Vitolo, and in the 10th minute, Šime Vrsaljko was sent off with a red card, followed by Simeone being also sent off. Despite playing with ten men, without their manager at the bench, with most players in makeshift positions, and enjoying only 24% of ball possession, the team lost neither its shape nor its composure, eventually holding out to a 1–1 draw that was enough for them to progress to the final. "Simeone taught us to enjoy suffering," Arda Turan said in 2015, supporting this feeling that the Argentinean coach is a man who takes the best things out of bad situations. Diego Godin has also said about his manager: "The players would die for him [Simeone]. He gives belief that we can compete against much bigger teams. We have great confidence in him, we are with him to the death and also he with us - and that shows on the pitch. I believe the whole team has confidence in the coach and we all know the path we have to take: he marks the way for us and we go with him until the death. That is how you achieve things."

In the 2020–21 season, amid COVID-19 and injury crisis among the team's forwards, Simeone experimented with back three formations, such as 5–3–2 and 3–5–2. This saw them adapt to a new, more possession-heavy style, averaging the majority of possession over the season for the first time since their victorious 2013–14 season.

Personal life
Simeone's sons Giovanni, Gianluca, and Giuliano are professional footballers, currently playing for Napoli, Xerez Deportivo and Zaragoza, respectively. Simeone also has two daughters, Francesca and Valentina, with model Carla Pereyra. Simeone and Pereyra got married in secret in June 2019.

Career statistics

Club
Source:

International
Source:

International goals
Argentina score listed first, score column indicates score after each Simeone goal.

Managerial statistics

Honours

Player

Atlético Madrid
La Liga: 1995–96
Copa del Rey: 1995–96

Inter Milan
UEFA Cup: 1997–98

Lazio
Serie A: 1999–2000
Coppa Italia: 1999–2000
Supercoppa Italiana: 2000
UEFA Super Cup: 1999

Argentina
Copa América: 1991, 1993 
King Fahd Cup: 1992
 Artemio Franchi Trophy: 1993
Olympic Silver Medal: 1996

Individual
Trofeo EFE: 1995–96

Manager
Estudiantes La Plata
Argentine Primera División: 2006 Torneo Apertura

River Plate
Argentine Primera División: 2008 Torneo Clausura

Atlético Madrid
La Liga: 2013–14, 2020–21
Copa del Rey: 2012–13
Supercopa de España: 2014
UEFA Europa League: 2011–12, 2017–18
UEFA Super Cup: 2012, 2018
UEFA Champions League runner-up: 2013–14, 2015–16

Individual
European Coach of the Season: 2011–12
La Liga Manager of the Month: October 2013, November 2015, March 2017
Trofeo Comunidad Iberoamericana: 2014
La Liga Coach of the Year: 2012–13, 2013–14, 2015–16, 2020–21
Miguel Muñoz Trophy: 2013–14, 2015–16, 2020–21
Facebook/MARCA Football Awards (Best Manager): 2016
IFFHS World's Best Club Coach: 2016
Globe Soccer Master Coach Special Award: 2017
IFFHS Club Coach of the Decade: 2011–2020
Konex Awards: 2020

See also
 List of UEFA Cup and Europa League winning managers
 List of footballers with 100 or more caps

References

External links

Profile and Statistics at yahoo.com

Managerial statistics in the Argentine Primera at Fútbol XXI  

1970 births
Living people
Simeone family
Argentine people of Italian descent
Footballers from Buenos Aires
Argentine footballers
Association football midfielders
Club Atlético Vélez Sarsfield footballers
Pisa S.C. players
Sevilla FC players
Atlético Madrid footballers
Inter Milan players
S.S. Lazio players
Racing Club de Avellaneda footballers
Argentine Primera División players
Serie A players
Serie B players
La Liga players
UEFA Cup winning players
Argentina youth international footballers
Argentina under-20 international footballers
Argentina international footballers
1991 Copa América players
1992 King Fahd Cup players
1993 Copa América players
1994 FIFA World Cup players
1995 Copa América players
Footballers at the 1996 Summer Olympics
1998 FIFA World Cup players
1999 Copa América players
2002 FIFA World Cup players
Copa América-winning players
FIFA Confederations Cup-winning players
Olympic medalists in football
Olympic footballers of Argentina
Olympic silver medalists for Argentina
FIFA Century Club
Argentine expatriate footballers
Argentine expatriate sportspeople in Italy
Argentine expatriate sportspeople in Spain
Expatriate footballers in Italy
Expatriate footballers in Spain
Argentine football managers
Racing Club de Avellaneda managers
Estudiantes de La Plata managers
Club Atlético River Plate managers
San Lorenzo de Almagro managers
Catania S.S.D. managers
Atlético Madrid managers
Argentine Primera División managers
Serie A managers
La Liga managers
UEFA Europa League winning managers
Argentine expatriate football managers
Expatriate football managers in Italy
Expatriate football managers in Spain
Medalists at the 1996 Summer Olympics